Grand Canyon is a 1991 American drama film directed and produced by Lawrence Kasdan, and written by Kasdan with his wife Meg. Featuring an ensemble cast, the film is about random events affecting a diverse group of people, exploring the race- and class-imposed chasms which separate members of the same community.

The film was produced and distributed by 20th Century Fox and was released on Christmas Day, 1991. Grand Canyon was advertised as "The Big Chill for the '90s", in reference to an earlier Kasdan film.

Plot
After attending a Lakers basketball game, an immigration lawyer named Mack finds himself at the mercy of potential muggers when his car breaks down in a bad part of Los Angeles late at night. The muggers are talked out of their plans by Simon, a tow truck driver who arrives just in time. Mack sets out to befriend Simon, despite their having nothing in common.

In the meantime, Mack's wife Claire and his best friend Davis, a producer of violent action films, are experiencing life-changing events. Claire encounters an abandoned baby while jogging and becomes determined to adopt her. Davis suddenly becomes interested in philosophy rather than box-office profits after being shot in the leg by a man trying to steal his watch, vowing to devote the remainder of his career to eliminating violence from the cinema.

The film chronicles how these characters—as well as various acquaintances, co-workers and relatives—are affected by their interactions in the light of life-changing events. In the end, they visit the Grand Canyon on a shared vacation trip, united in a place that is philosophically and actually "bigger" than all their little separate lives.

Cast

Production
Writer-director Lawrence Kasdan explained, "Part of what Grand Canyon is about is that we have accepted the fact that our city is not our own. That for people from South Central, for them to go into Beverly Hills and West L.A., the police are on the lookout. They feel unwelcome, are under threat. And vice-versa. Our cities have become these little armed camps."

Parts of the film were shot at Glen Canyon in Utah as well as Los Angeles and Canoga Park, California and the Grand Canyon in Arizona.

The footage of the Los Angeles Lakers game in the film was shot before anybody knew Lakers guard Earvin "Magic" Johnson was HIV+. Rita Kempley, in her film review in The Washington Post, pointed to this scene as proof that "... the filmmaker and his team ha[d] truly caught society on the verge."

The character Davis is based on action film producer Joel Silver.

Soundtrack
Grand Canyon: Music From the Original Motion Picture Soundtrack was released in 1992 on Milan Records. In 2013 a remastered and expanded edition was released on La-La Land Records. This version does not contain Warren Zevon's "Searching for a Heart."

Track listing

Personnel

 James Newton Howard: Piano, Keyboards, Synthesized Bass, Synthesizer Programming, Programming, Orchestration
 Dean Parks, Michael Landau, Jude Cole, Davey Johnstone: Guitars
 Michael Boddicker: Programming, Synthesizer, Synthesizer Programming
 Simon Franglen: Synclavier Programming
 John "J.R." Robinson: Drums
 Neil Stubenhaus: Bass Guitar
 Chuck Domanico: Acoustic Bass
 Michael Lang: Piano
 Joe Porcaro, Emil Richards, Donald Williams, Mike Fisher: Percussions
 Kirk Whalum, Larry Williams: Saxophones
 Paul Salamunovich: Choir Director, Choir Master
 Warren Zevon: Performer (track 9)
 Grand Canyon Fanfare Orchestra: Performer (track 16)
 Chris Boardman, Brad Dechter: Orchestrations
 Marty Paich: Conductor
 Tommy Johnson, Jim Self: Tubas
 Rick Baptist, Charlie Davis, Gary Grant, Mario Guarneri, Jerry Hey, John Richard Lewis, Jon Lewis, Warren Luening, Malcolm McNabb: Trumpets
 Gayle Levant: Harp
 Charles Loper, Bill Reichenbach Jr., George Thatcher: Trombones
 David Duke, Joe Meyer, Brian O'Connor, John A. Reynolds, James Thatcher, Richard Todd: French Horns

Reception

Box office
Grand Canyon earned $40.9 million worldwide.

Critical response
Grand Canyon received generally positive reviews from critics; it has a 7/10 "fresh" rating at Rotten Tomatoes and a critical rating of 78% based on 36 reviews. Janet Maslin of The New York Times wrote,

Washington Post critic Rita Kempley wrote,

Owen Gleiberman of Entertainment Weekly chided the film for its "... solemn zeitgeist chic," and called it "... way too self-conscious," but ultimately decided that "Grand Canyon is finally a very classy soap opera, one that holds a generous mirror up to its audience's anxieties. It's the sort of movie that says: Life is worth living. After a couple of hours spent with characters this enjoyable, the message—in all its forthright sentimentality—feels earned."

Film critic Roger Ebert gave the film four out of four stars, and wrote, "In a time when our cities are wounded, movies like Grand Canyon can help to heal." Ebert's television reviewing partner Gene Siskel also loved the film, with Ebert placing it at the #4 and Siskel at #6 on their 1991 top ten lists.

Accolades

Legacy
Phil Collins' 1993 song "Both Sides of the Story" references the scene from Grand Canyon where the young mugger tells Simon (played by Danny Glover) that he carries a gun to make sure people respect (and fear) him.

See also
 List of films featuring the deaf and hard of hearing
 Hood film

References

External links

 
 

1991 films
1991 drama films
American drama films
Films directed by Lawrence Kasdan
1990s English-language films
20th Century Fox films
Golden Bear winners
Films set in Arizona
Films set in Los Angeles
Films shot in Los Angeles
Films about race and ethnicity
Films shot in Arizona
Films shot in California
Films shot in Utah
Films scored by James Newton Howard
1990s American films